This is a list of rulers and office-holders of Ghana.

Heads of state
List of heads of state of Ghana

Colonial governors
List of Governors-General of Ghana
List of governors of the Gold Coast
List of colonial governors of the Danish Gold Coast
List of colonial governors of the Dutch Gold Coast

Heads of traditional states

Akan states
List of rulers of the Akan state of Adanse
List of rulers of the Akan state of Akuapem
List of rulers of the Akan state of Akuapem Anafo
List of rulers of the Akan state of Akuapem Guan
List of rulers of the Akan state of Akuapem Okere
List of rulers of the Akan state of Akyem Abuakwa
List of rulers of the Akan state of Akyem Bosume
List of rulers of the Akan state of Akyem Kotoku
Rulers of the Akan state of Asante (Asanteman)
List of rulers of the Akan state of Assin Apimenem
List of rulers of the Akan state of Assin Atadanso
List of rulers of the Akan states of Akwamu and Twifo-Heman
List of rulers of the Akan state of Bono-Tekyiman
List of rulers of the Akan state of Denkyira
List of rulers of the Akan state of Dwaben
List of rulers of the Fante Confederation
List of rulers of the Akan state of Gyaaman
List of rulers of the Akan state of Manya Krobo

Ewe states
List of rulers of the Ewe state of Anlo
List of rulers of the Ewe state of Peki

Gã (Nkran) (Accra)
List of rulers of Gã (Nkran)

Northern States
List of rulers of the Kingdom of Dagbon
List of rulers of the Northern state of Gonja
List of rulers of the Northern state of Mamprusi
List of rulers of Nanumba
List of rulers of the Northern state of Wa

Heads of former states
Rulers of the Ashanti, see List of rulers of Asante

See also
Lists of office-holders

Rulers
Ghana
Rulers